Noonan is a small community in the Canadian province of New Brunswick. It is located approximately 10 km north-east of Fredericton, New Brunswick.

History

Notable people

See also
List of communities in New Brunswick

References

Communities in Sunbury County, New Brunswick
Designated places in New Brunswick